James Grattan may refer to:
James Grattan (MP for Dublin City) (1711–1766), MP for Dublin City, father of Henry Grattan
James Grattan (Wicklow MP) (1783–1854), Irish politician, MP for Wicklow
James Grattan (curler) (born 1974), Canadian curler

See also
Grattan (disambiguation)